Expresión is the twelfth studio album recorded by Puerto Rican salsa singer Gilberto Santa Rosa released on July 6, 1999. The album received a Latin Grammy nomination for Best Salsa Album.

Track listing
This information adapted from Allmusic.

Chart performance

Certification

References

1999 albums
Gilberto Santa Rosa albums
Sony Discos albums